The Great Western Trail is a rail trail in the Des Moines metropolitan area south-central Iowa, United States.

Description
Starting in Water Works Park in Des Moines at its north end, it passes through suburban areas, Willow Creek Golf Course, fields, farmland, and the wooded valley of the North River, with a southern terminus in Martensdale.

The trail follows the route of an abandoned line of the Chicago, St. Paul and Kansas City Railroad, constructed in 1899. It is named after the Chicago Great Western Railway, which last operated trains over the segment in 1968. The trail is maintained by the Conservation Boards of Polk and Warren Counties.

See also
 List of rail trails

References

External links 

 Iowa Tourism-Trails
 Warren County Conservation Board-Great Western Trail

Rail trails in Iowa
Protected areas of Polk County, Iowa
Protected areas of Warren County, Iowa
Geography of Des Moines, Iowa
Transportation in Des Moines, Iowa
Chicago and North Western Railway
Tourist attractions in Des Moines, Iowa